The Fairfax Bridge was a truss bridge over the Missouri River that handled southbound U.S. Route 69 (US 69), connecting Interstate 635 (I-635) in Riverside, Missouri with the Seventh Street Trafficway in Fairfax, Kansas. The bridge has now been removed, with the approach spans being demolished using explosive charges on January 16, 2015, and the main spans on January 24, 2015.

History
Ground was broken April 21, 1931, with the bridge opening on September 27, 1934, at a cost of $600,000. Originally carrying two-way traffic, it was restriped for two southbound lanes in 1957 following the opening of its sister bridge, the Platte Purchase Bridge, which handles northbound traffic. In 2013 plans were announced for replacement of both the Fairfax Bridge and the Platte Purchase Bridge. The Fairfax Bridge was scheduled for demolition first in early 2015, with the bridge closed to all traffic on October 31, 2014, and traffic routed to the Platte Purchase Bridge.

The replacement bridge was formally opened by the Missouri Department of Transportation on March 16, 2017.

See also
 
 
 
 
 List of crossings of the Missouri River

References

External links
 Kansas City Public Library history
 Kansas City Kansan Article

Bridges in Kansas City, Kansas
Buildings and structures in Platte County, Missouri
Buildings and structures demolished in 2015
Transportation in the Kansas City metropolitan area
Bridges over the Missouri River
Bridges completed in 1934
Road bridges in Missouri
Road bridges in Kansas
U.S. Route 69
Bridges of the United States Numbered Highway System
1934 establishments in the United States
Interstate vehicle bridges in the United States